Brajkovac may refer to:

Brajkovac, Lazarevac
Brajkovac, Prijepolje
Brajkovac, Kruševac

See also
Brajkovići (disambiguation)
Brajnovac